A majority-minority district is an electoral district, such as a United States congressional district, in which the majority of the constituents in the district are racial or ethnic minorities (as opposed to Non-Hispanic whites in the U.S.). Race is collected through the decennial United States census.

Majority-minority districts may be created to avoid or remedy violations of the Voting Rights Act of 1965's prohibitions on drawing redistricting plans that diminish the ability of a racial or language minority to elect its candidates of choice. In some instances, majority-minority districts may result from affirmative racial gerrymandering. The value of drawing district lines to create majority-minority districts is a matter of dispute both within and outside of minority communities. Some view majority-minority districts as a way to dilute the voting power of minorities and analogous to racial segregation; others favor majority-minority districts as ways to effectively ensure the election of minorities to legislative bodies, including the House of Representatives. Majority-minority districts have been the subject of legal cases examining the constitutionality of such districts, including  Shaw v. Reno (1993), Miller v. Johnson (1995), and Bush v. Vera (1996).

Districts with an African-American majority
Population data are from 2019 Census American Community Survey One-Year Estimates. Districts in the table below reflect the 117th Congress.

Currently, there are 22 congressional districts where African Americans make up a majority of constituents. Every district is represented by Democrats. There are two African American majority congressional districts that are represented by someone who is not African American: Steve Cohen from Tennessee's 9th and Rashida Tlaib from Michigan's 13th.

Districts with an Asian-American majority or plurality
Currently, Asian-Americans make up the majority of constituents in two districts. California's 17th represented by Indian-American Ro Khanna and Hawaii's 1st represented by non-Asian Ed Case. Both are Democrats.

Districts with a Hispanic/Latino majority

Districts with an African-American plurality
Florida's 5th congressional district
Illinois's 7th congressional district
Missouri's 1st congressional district
New York's 5th congressional district
North Carolina's 1st congressional district
Virginia's 3rd congressional district
Texas's 30th congressional district

Districts with a Hispanic/Latino plurality
California's 9th congressional district
California's 16th congressional district
California's 18th congressional district
California's 19th congressional district
California's 22nd congressional district
California's 36th congressional district
California's 37th congressional district
California's 39th congressional district
California's 43rd congressional district
California's 47th congressional district
Illinois's 3rd congressional district
Nevada's 1st congressional district
New Mexico's 1st congressional district
New Mexico's 3rd congressional district
New York's 7th congressional district
New York's 13th congressional district
New York's 14th congressional district
Texas's 9th congressional district
Texas's 18th congressional district

Districts with a white plurality (majority-minority)
Arizona's 1st congressional district
California's 3rd congressional district
California's 6th congressional district
California's 8th congressional district
California's 10th congressional district
California's 11th congressional district
California's 12th congressional district
California's 13th congressional district
California's 14th congressional district
California's 15th congressional district
California's 23rd congressional district
California's 25th congressional district
California's 26th congressional district
California's 42nd congressional district
Florida's 9th congressional district
Florida's 10th congressional district
Florida's 14th congressional district
Florida's 23rd congressional district
Georgia's 7th congressional district
Hawaii's 2nd congressional district
Maryland’s 5th congressional district
Massachusetts's 7th congressional district
Nevada's 4th congressional district
New Jersey's 6th congressional district
New Jersey's 9th congressional district
New Jersey's 12th congressional district
New York's 16th congressional district
North Carolina's 12th congressional district
Pennsylvania's 2nd congressional district
Texas's 2nd congressional district
Texas's 5th congressional district
Texas's 7th congressional district
Texas's 22nd congressional district
Texas's 32nd congressional district
Virginia's 11th congressional district
Washington's 9th congressional district
Wisconsin's 4th congressional district

See also
Majority minority
Race in the United States
Voting Rights Act

References

External links
Use of Racial Data in Redistricting - Background Paper Prepared for the Minnesota Legislature Subcommittee on Geographic Information Systems
Majority-Minority Voting Districts and Their Role in Politics: Their Advantages, Their Drawbacks, and the Current Law
Voting wrongs - racial reapportionment
Race and Redistricting: The Shaw-Cromartie Cases
The Electoral Competitiveness of Majority-Minority Districts
Redrawing Lines of Power: Redistricting 2011 Making Contact, produced by the National Radio Project, April 12, 2011

United States congressional districts